The Nordic Indoor Race Walking Championships was a biennial one-day competition in indoor racewalking between athletes from the Nordic countries organised by Nordic Athletics. Established in 1974, it lasted for three editions before holding the last competition in 1978. The competition was held in February in even-numbered years, alternating with the Nordic Race Walking Championships held outdoors in odd-numbered years. Turku in Finland hosted the first and final editions, while Östersund in Sweden served as host for the second edition.

Editions

References

Editions
Competition Venues. Nordic Athletics. Retrieved 2019-08-13.

Nordic Athletics competitions
Recurring sporting events established in 1974
Recurring sporting events disestablished in 1978
1974 establishments in Finland
Racewalking competitions
Indoor track and field competitions
Defunct athletics competitions